A seriality is a social construct which differs from a mere group of individuals. Serialities take the form of labels which are either imposed onto persons or voluntarily adopted by them. A seriality can be "unbound" and self-identified, for example workers, patriots, or anarchists, or "bound" and identified by authority census and elections, such as Asian-Americans or Tutsis.

Benedict Anderson describes bound seriality as an insidious power grab by political authority. When a state gains an interest in power they may serialize their citizens in order to identify them, for example, forcing citizens to adopt a family name or (more recently) a national identification number. 

The term is also used in gender studies.

See also
patronymic
matronymic
family name

References
 Benedict Anderson. The Spectre of Comparisons. 1998.

See also
 Critique of Dialectical Reason

Social constructionism
Collective identity